Loy Allen Jr. is a former professional NASCAR Winston Cup, Busch, and ARCA series race car driver, turned real estate developer and embry-riddle-trained commercial pilot. On February 12, 1994, he became the youngest and first rookie in NASCAR Winston Cup history to win the Daytona 500 pole.

Racing career

Early Racing Days 
1971-1993:  Loy Allen Jr. began racing go karts at the age of five in Raleigh, North Carolina. He continued to progress his way up through each racing circuit level. By the age of 16, he had won several World Karting Association Championships and had already graduated to racing dirt late model cars. He also earned his Commercial Pilot’s license from Embry-Riddle Aeronautical University, as his passion for aviation paralleled his passion for racing.

Winston Cup Career
1993:  Loy Allen Jr. made his Winston Cup debut at Daytona International Speedway on July 3rd. He drove the #37 Naturally Fresh Ford, a former Robert Yates Race Car, starting in 40th position, finishing in 29th. He went on to compete at Talladega Superspeedway on July 25th, where he placed 26th in the #37 Naturally Fresh Ford. Following that race, he joined the TriStar Motorsports Team in October at Phoenix Raceway Slick 50 500. He drove the #68 Country Time Ford, finishing 26th.

1994:  After winning eight poles in 15 starts and a race at Atlanta Motor Speedway in the ARCA Series, Loy Allen Jr. continued on driving for TriStar Motorsports Team in the #19 Hooters Ford. It was at the season-opening Daytona 500 that he became the youngest and first Rookie in Winston Cup history to win the Daytona 500 pole. He would go on to finish 22nd in the race. In May, he finished 11th at the Coca-Cola 600 in Charlotte. He went on to finish 15th in the Budweiser 500 at Dover International Speedway in June and finished 17th in the Miller 500 at Pocono Raceway. In July, at Daytona, he missed the pole by hundredths of a second, as the late Winston Cup race car driver, Dale Earnhardt Sr claimed the top spot. Allen had no wins and no top tens, had an average finish of 28.8 and finished 39th in the standings. However, he had 3 pole’s on the season despite not qualifying for 12 races.

With 7 DNFS, the TriStar Motorsports Team and Loy Allen Jr. achieved 1 Top-10 finish in 1994.

1995:  Loy Allen Jr. ran four races for Junior Johnson Motorsports Team in the Hooters #27 Ford. He ran seven races for TriStar Motorsports. In their first race at Talladega, Loy Allen Jr qualified 2nd,  finishing 10th, his career-high Winston Cup Nascar finish.

1996:  In the 2nd race of the season at Rockingham Speedway, Loy suffered a neck injury that put him out of commission for several races. He recovered and returned to Pocono International Raceway in June finishing 23rd, followed by 21st at Talladega Superspeedway.

1997:  Loy Allen Jr. continued racing with the TriStar Motorsports Team. He finished 26th at Daytona International Speedway, and 43rd at Rockingham Speedway. 

1999:  After a two-year hiatus, he qualified for races at Michigan and Daytona.

Busch Series career
Loy Allen Jr made 4 appearances in the NASCAR Busch Series during his career, with one Top-10 finish at Charlotte.

1995:  At Charlotte Motor Speedway in May, Loy Allen Jr qualified 21st in the #19 Chevrolet. A multi-car crash on lap 27 led to time spent in the garage, resulting in a 43rd place finish.

1997:  Loy Allen Jr started the inaugural race at California in the #48 UniFirst Ford Thunderbird, replacing Randy Porter. He started 42nd and finished 35th.

1998:  Loy Allen Jr finished 7th place at Talladega Superspeedway in the #78 Church's Chicken Chevy--his career-high Busch Series finish.

Motorsports career results

NASCAR
(key) (Bold – Pole position awarded by qualifying time. Italics – Pole position earned by points standings. * – Most laps led.)

Winston Cup Series

Daytona 500

Busch Series

ARCA Bondo/Mar-Hyde Series
(key) (Bold – Pole position awarded by qualifying time. Italics – Pole position earned by points standings or practice time. * – Most laps led.)

See also
 List of Daytona 500 pole position winners
 List of people from Raleigh, North Carolina

References

External links
 

Living people
1966 births
Sportspeople from Raleigh, North Carolina
Racing drivers from North Carolina
ARCA Menards Series drivers
NASCAR drivers